Schiesser AG is a German underwear and lingerie brand which is headquartered in Radolfzell, Germany. It was founded in 1875 by Jacques Schiesser.

History
It was founded in 1875 and by 1880 had grown to 280 employees. When the founder Jacques Schiesser died from heart failure in 1913, the company already employed 1200 people, and it has since worked itself into a global brand. Since 2011, Schiesser has been owned by the Israeli corporation Delta Galil.

References

External links
Schiesser website
Delta Galil Industries Ltd. website

1875 establishments in Germany
Clothing brands of Germany
Companies based in Baden-Württemberg
German brands
Underwear brands
Lingerie brands